Code Red DVD was an independent American home entertainment company specializing in retro grindhouse, exploitation, and horror films, operated by Bill Norton Olsen. The company originally began releasing films on DVD in 2006, and later began releasing and re-releasing titles on Blu-ray.

History
Code Red was begun in 2006 by president Bill Norton Olsen. The company's first release was Don't Go in the Woods... Alone!, released on October 24, 2006. The Fabulous Journey to the Center of the Earth (1978) was the company's second release, followed by the horror film Devil Times Five (1974). Some of the early Code Red releases were purchased from Media Blasters.

In 2010, the website RetroSlashers reported that Code Red would be shutting down, and Olsen later stated that he had run out of money and was facing putting up his home in order to keep the company running.

Series
Code Red employs several series in its catalogue, which feature both standalone and double feature releases. The company's running series include:
Exploitation Cinema
Maria's "B" Movie Mayhem (hosted by Maria Kanellis)
Post-Apocalyptic Collection
Roger Corman's Post-Nuke Collection

DVD releases

Blu-ray releases

References

Home video companies of the United States
Film distributors of the United States